Sasagawa is a Japanese surname. Notable people with the surname include:

Hiroshi Sasagawa (born 1936), creator of several anime and manga series
Ryohei Sasagawa, fictional character in the anime and manga series Reborn! by Akira Amano
Ryuhei Sasagawa, character in the novel Battle Royale
Takashi Sasagawa (born 1935), Japanese politician of the Liberal Democratic Party

Japanese-language surnames